Kurəkçi (also, Kurakchi and Kurekchi) is a village and municipality in the Yardimli District of Azerbaijan. It has a population of 1,851. The municipality consists of the villages of Kürəkçi and Gərsavan.

References 

Populated places in Yardimli District